The Occult Roots of Nazism: The Ariosophists of Austria and Germany, 1890–1935 is a book about Nazi occultism and Ariosophy by historian Nicholas Goodrick-Clarke, who traces some of its roots back to Esotericism in Germany and Austria between 1880 and 1945. The foreword is by Rohan Butler, who had written The Roots of National Socialism in the 1930s. The book is based on Goodrick-Clarke's 1982 Ph.D. thesis The ariosophists of Austria and Germany 1890-1935: Reactionary political fantasy in relation to social anxiety.

This book has been continually in print since its first publication in 1985, and has been translated into twelve languages, including Spanish, French, Polish, Italian, Russian, Czech, German and Greek. It was republished as a paperback by New York University Press in 1992, and more recently republished by I.B. Tauris & Co Ltd.

The German edition features a preface and an additional essay Nationalsozialismus und Okkultismus (National Socialism and Occultism) (15 pages) by H.T. Hakl.

Publication history 
The exact title of the book changed in the 1992 edition.  Foreign language editions are also (partly) listed:

Nicholas Goodrick-Clarke 1985:  The Occult Roots of Nazism: The Ariosophists of Austria and Germany, 1890–1935, Wellingborough, England: The Aquarian Press. .
1992: The Occult Roots of Nazism: Secret Aryan Cults and Their Influence on Nazi Ideology, New York: New York University Press 
2004: The Occult Roots of Nazism: Secret Aryan Cults and Their Influence on Nazi Ideology, (Expanded with a new Preface) I.B. Tauris & Co. .
Spanish edition 2005: Las Oscuras Raíces del Nazismo. Buenos Aires: Editorial Sudamericana 
French edition 1989: Les racines occultistes du nazisme: Les Aryosophistes en Autriche et en Allemagne 1890–1935 .
Russian edition 1993: Оккультные корни нацизма
German edition 1997:  Die okkulten Wurzeln des Nationalsozialismus. Graz, Austria: Stocker . 
2. German edition 2000: Graz: Stocker .
3. German edition 2004: Wiesbaden: Marix-Verlag  .
Greek edition 2006: ΟΙ ΑΠΟΚΡΥΦΙΣΤΙΚΕΣ ΡΙΖΕΣ ΤΟΥ ΝΑΖΙΣΜΟΥ 
Czech edition 1998: Okultní kořeny nacismu: Rakouští a němečtí ariosofisté 1890-1935: Tajné árijské kulty a jejich vliv na nacistickou ideologii. Prague: Votobia 
2. Czech edition 2005: Okultní kořeny nacismu: Tajné árijské kulty a jejich vliv na nacistickou ideologii. Prague: Eminent 
Polish edition 2001: Okultystyczne źródła nazizmu. Warsaw: Bellona 
2. Polish edition 2011: Okultystyczne źródła nazizmu. Warsaw: Aletheia 
3. Portuguese edition: Raízes Ocultistas do Nazismo: cultos secretos arianos e sua influência na ideologia nazi, Lisboa, Terramar, Agosto 2002.

References

External links
 

1985 non-fiction books
Books about Nazism
Books by Nicholas Goodrick-Clarke
History books about Nazi Germany
Occultism in Nazism
20th-century history books
New York University Press books
Books about the far right